Maîtrejean is a French surname. Notable people with the surname include:

 Corinne Maîtrejean (born 1979), French foil fencer
 Rirette Maîtrejean (1887–1968), French anarchist and feminist

French-language surnames